The Mall at Prince George's, formerly known as (and still often referred to as) Prince George's Plaza, is an enclosed regional shopping mall located in Hyattsville, Maryland, at the intersection of Belcrest Road and East-West Highway (Maryland Route 410). It is served by a Washington Metro station, Hyattsville Crossing. This station is on the Green Line and Yellow Line. Located across Belcrest Road from the Mall is the University Town Center mixed-use development. 

The Mall at Prince George's is anchored by Five Below, TJ Maxx, Ross Dress For Less, Marshalls, Macy's, and Target. It is currently owned and managed by PREIT.

History
The mall opened as an open-air shopping center in 1959, known as the Prince George's Plaza (PGP). It was expanded several times and was enclosed in the late-1970s. It was known as Prince Georges Plaza until November 14, 2004, when it was renamed to its current name of The Mall at Prince George's following an extensive renovation.

Hecht Company

The opening of the Plaza's Hecht Company store on November 2, 1958, signaled the opening of Prince George's Plaza. It was the fourth D.C.-area store in the rapidly growing chain. An estimated 3,000 persons attended the opening for ceremonial speeches and the ribbon-cutting. The principal speaker was Maryland Gov. Theodore R. McKeldin. The governor purchased a six-foot aluminum ladder from the Hecht Company, which he said he would use in his recently purchased home in Baltimore. There was parking for some 4,000 cars.

In September 2006, the store was converted into a Macy's, following the disbandment of Hecht's.

Grand Union
The following month another anchor, Grand Union supermarket, opened its doors.  On December 17, 1958, Santa Claus cut the red ribbon at 9 a.m. at the grand opening of the Grand Union store.  He arrived by helicopter to ceremonially open the new  store.

The store also featured a "food-o-matic display" that housed the canned and packaged goods. It also included a gourmet foods department featuring one of the largest varieties of the world's finest cheeses to be found anywhere in the metropolitan area. The store also featured a rotisserie for barbecued chicken, a service bakery, and fully automated check-out booths.

Food-a-rama, a local Baltimore chain, bought the Prince George's Plaza Grand Union store along with other Grand Union and Basics stores in Maryland and D.C. in 1984. The Hyattsville store was converted to a high-volume store. After the supermarket closed, Kids "R" Us occupied the space for several years, followed by Office Depot, which closed in March 2009 and which was replaced by Kids 4 Less, which in turn closed in 2013 to make way for TJ Maxx.

Raleigh's

In December 1965, Raleigh Haberdasher announced plans to lease  in the Prince George's Plaza shopping center for its fifth store in the Washington area. The store opened in the spring of 1966. After Raleigh's closed the location in 1991, it was broken up into a variety of retail spaces. The entire Raleigh Haberdasher chain closed by the end of 1992. The former Raleigh's space was eventually demolished and rebuilt as Target (which opened late 2004), with Marshalls and Ross Dress for Less opening on the lower level of the new space shortly thereafter.

Woodward & Lothrop
Another local department store, Woodward & Lothrop, opened at Prince George's Plaza in August 1966. While building the Woodies store, two boys were killed when digging in a cave on a fragile hillside nearby.  After the demise of the Woodies chain in 1995, the space was occupied by JCPenney.

On June 23, 2020, JCPenney announced that it would close in October 2020 as part of a plan to close 13 stores nationwide.

References

External links

 

Shopping malls in Maryland
Shopping malls in the Washington metropolitan area
Hyattsville, Maryland
Buildings and structures in Prince George's County, Maryland
Pennsylvania Real Estate Investment Trust
Shopping malls established in 1959
1959 establishments in Maryland
Tourist attractions in Prince George's County, Maryland